Psycosissimo is a 1961 Italian crime-comedy film directed by Steno. The title is a parody of Alfred Hitchcock's Psycho.

Cast 

 Ugo Tognazzi: Ugo Bertolazzi 
 Raimondo Vianello: Raimondo Vallardi 
 Edy Vessel: Annalisa Michelotti 
 Monique Just: Marcella Bertolazzi 
 Franca Marzi: Clotilde Scarponi 
 Spiros Focás: Pietro,  Annalisa's Driver and Lover 
 Francesco Mulé: Arturo Michelotti 
 Leonardo Severini: Inspector
 Nerio Bernardi: Professor 
 Toni Ucci: Augusto 
 Mario De Simone: as a gas station attendant in Anzio (uncredited) 
 Ugo Pagliai: Student

References

External links
 
Psycosissimo at Variety Distribution 

1961 films
Italian parody films
Films directed by Stefano Vanzina
1960s parody films
Films scored by Carlo Rustichelli
1960s crime comedy films
1961 comedy films
1960s Italian-language films
1960s Italian films